Iván Fresneda Corraliza (born 28 September 2004) is a Spanish professional footballer who plays as a right-back for La Liga club Valladolid.

Club career
Fresneda was born in Madrid, and joined Real Madrid's La Fábrica in 2014, after representing EMFO Boadilla and CF Quijorna. He left the club in 2018, and spent two years at CD Leganés before signing for Real Valladolid in 2020.

After featuring twice with the reserves as an unused substitute, Fresneda was called up to train with the main squad by manager Pacheta in December 2021, being the first under-18 player to feature with the first team since Dani Vega in 2014. On 5 January 2022, as both Luis Pérez and Saidy Janko were unavailable, he made his professional debut with the Blanquivioletas at the age of just 17, starting in a 3–0 home loss against Real Betis in the season's Copa del Rey.

Fresneda made his La Liga debut on 9 September 2022, replacing injured Pérez in a 2–1 away loss against Girona FC.

Career statistics

Club

References

External links
Real Madrid profile 

2004 births
Living people
Spanish footballers
Footballers from Madrid
Association football defenders
La Liga players
Segunda División players
Primera Federación players
Real Valladolid Promesas players
Real Valladolid players
Spain youth international footballers